Ensemble Scolaire Saint Michel de Picpus is a Roman Catholic private school system in the Paris metropolitan area. It has a preschool/nursery (maternelle) and elementary school in the 12th arrondissement of Paris. It has two junior-senior high (collège-lycée) campuses: one in the 12th arrondissement of Paris and one in Saint-Mandé, Val-de-Marne.

References

External links
 Ensemble Scolaire Saint Michel de Picpus 

Schools in Paris
Schools in Val-de-Marne
Lycées in Paris
Lycées in Val-de-Marne